Sibirenauta is a genus of left-handed or sinistral, air-breathing freshwater snails, aquatic pulmonate gastropod mollusks in the family Physidae.

The scientific name Sibirenauta is composed from the word Siberia, where its species live and from the Latin word nauta, that means "sailor".

Distribution
Distribution the genus Sibirenauta ranges from Siberia to Canada and the United States of America.

Species
Species in the genus Sibirenauta include:
 Sibirenauta depressior (Middendorff, 1851) - type species
 Sibirenauta elongatus (Say, 1821)
 Sibirenauta pictus (Krause, 1883)
 Sibirenauta sibiricus (Westerlund, 1877)

References 

Physidae